Plamen Timnev (born 26 March 1973) is a former Bulgarian footballer who played as a forward.

Club career

Timnev spent almost his entire career in the top flight of Bulgarian football, establishing himself as one of Varna's football legends. He also had a short stint in Portugal in 1999. Outside of football, Timnev has been involved in various business ventures.

References

External links
 Profile at foradejogo.net
 Statistics at levskisofia.info

1973 births
Living people
Bulgarian footballers
Association football forwards
PFC Cherno More Varna players
PFC Spartak Varna players
Neftochimic Burgas players
PFC Levski Sofia players
First Professional Football League (Bulgaria) players
Expatriate footballers in Portugal
Bulgarian expatriate sportspeople in Portugal
Bulgarian expatriate footballers
Sportspeople from Varna, Bulgaria